The Presidential Advisory Council on HIV/AIDS (PACHA) advises the White House and the Secretary of Health and Human Services on the US government's response to the AIDS epidemic. The commission was formed by President Bill Clinton in 1995 and each president since has renewed the council's charter.

Six members resigned in protest of President Donald Trump's health policies in June 2017, and the remaining ten members were dismissed by Trump on 28 December 2017. While PACHA did not meet in 2018, it was restaffed in 2019 and reconvened in March, June, and October 2019.

History 
The Council was not the first presidential inquiry into HIV. In 1987, Ronald Reagan appointed the President's Commission on the HIV Epidemic (1987–88) to investigate the AIDS epidemic. This was followed by the National Commission on AIDS (1989–1993).

Members

Current members 
On Dec. 11, 2018, Secretary Alex Azar of the U.S. Department of Health and Human Services nominated Carl Schmid and John Weisman to serve as PACHA co-chairs  when the council reconvened on March 14–15, 2019. Schmid is deputy executive director of The AIDS Institute, and a longtime leader and activist on HIV issues. Weisman is the secretary of health for Washington state and past president of the Association of State and Territorial Health Officers.

The current PACHA members are:

Former members 
Through 2018, the HIV.gov website (run by the U.S. Department of Health & Human Services) was not updated and continued to display two previous PACHA staff: B. Kaye Hayes, MPA, executive director, and Caroline Talev, MPA, public health analyst.
 Bruce G. Weniger, MD, MPH (original PACHA member 1995–2000) [formal self-introduction 1995-07-27, as archived at Clinton Presidential Library
 Nancy Mahon JD, PACHA chairperson – senior vice president, M.A.C Cosmetics; global executive director, Mac AIDS Fund
 David Holtgrave PhD, PACHA Vice-chair – professor and chair, Department of Health, Behavior and Society; Johns Hopkins Bloomberg School of Public Health, Baltimore, Maryland
 Ada Adimora MD MPH – professor, School of Medicine, professor of epidemiology, Gillings School of Global Public Health, University of North Carolina at Chapel Hill
 Jeffrey S. Akman MD – vice president for health affairs, George Washington University; dean, George Washington School of Medicine and Health Sciences
 Oliver Clyde Allen III – presiding bishop, United Progressive Pentecostal Fellowship of Churches, Atlanta, Georgia
 Lucy A. Bradley-Springer PhD RN ACRN FAAN – editor, Journal of the Association of Nurses in AIDS Care, associate professor emerita, University of Colorado, Denver, Colorado
 Gina M. Brown MSW – planning council co-ordinator, New Orleans Regional AIDS Planning Council
 Ulysses W. Burley III MD MPH – program director, Evangelical Lutheran Church, Chicago, Illinois
 Nicholas A. Carlisle JD – executive director, Southern AIDS Coalition
 Vignetta Charles PhD – chief science officer, ETR Associates
 Cecilia Chung – senior strategist, Transgender Law Center
 William H. Collier – head North America, VIIV Healthcare, Research Triangle Park, North Carolina
 Michelle Collins-Ogle MD FAAP AAHIVS – director, infectious diseases, Warren-Vance Community Health Center Inc., Henderson, North Carolina
 Yvette Flunder D. Min. – founder and senior pastor, City of Refuge United Church of Christ, Presiding Bishop, The Fellowship of Affirming Ministries, Oakland, California
 Grissel Granados MSW – project coordinator, Children's Hospital Los Angeles
 Jen Kates PhD – Chac liaison, director of global, health and HIV policy
 Gabriel Maldonado MBA – executive director and CEO, Truevolution, Riverside, California
 Patrick Sean Sullivan, DVM, PhD - Professor, Emory University Rollins School of Public Health, Atlanta Georgia
 Ligia Peralta MD FAAP FSAHM AAHIVS – president and CEO, Casa Ruben Foundation, commissioner, Maryland Health Care Commission
 Harlan Pruden – Two-Spirit Community organizer, Vancouver, Canada
 Scott A. Schoettes JD – HIV project director/senior attorney, Lambda Legal, Chicago, Illinois
 Lawrence Stallworth II – project assistant and HIV prevention specialist, Abounding Prosperity Inc.
 Elizabeth Styffe RN MN – director, HIV/AIDS ad orphan care initiatives, Saddleback Valley Community Church
 Mildred Williamson PhD MSW – director, research and regulatory affairs, Cook County Health and Hospitals System, Chicago, Illinois
 Thomas A. Coburn, M.D., former co-chair – an obstetrician and former Republican congressman from Oklahoma who gained a national reputation for his opposition to safer sex as a way to prevent HIV infections. Dr. Coburn is currently serving as the junior senator from Oklahoma.
 Louis Wade Sullivan, M.D., former co-chair – President's Office, Morehouse School of Medicine, Sullivan was the Secretary of Health and Human Services during the George H. W. Bush administration
 Rosa M. Biaggi, M.P.H., M.P.A – Connecticut Department of Public Health
 Charles W. Blackwell – served as the council's only Native American member from 1997 to 2001.
 Jacqueline S. Clements – Lincoln Community Health Center. Clements is an HIV testing counselor in rural North Carolina who is living with HIV and lost her husband and child to AIDS.
 Mildred  Freeman – director, Health Education Division, National Association for Equal Opportunity in Higher Education
 John F. Galbraith – president and CEO, Catholic Medical Mission Board
 Edward C. Green, Ph.D. – senior research scientist, Harvard Center for Population and Development Studies
 David Greer – a marketing and communications consultant in Philadelphia. He is living with HIV.
 Cheryl-Anne Hall
 Jane Hu, Ph.D. – CEO and founder, China Foundation, a philanthropic think tank
 Karen Ivantic-Doucette, M.S.N, FNP, ACRN – Marquette University College of Nursing
 Rashida  Jolley
 Franklyn  N. Judson, M.D. – professor and director, Denver Public Health Department
 Abner Mason – executive director, AIDS Responsibility Project
 Sandra S. McDonald – president/founder, OUTREACH, Inc
 Joe S. McIlhaney, M.D.
 Henry McKinnell Jr., Ph.D. – chairman and CEO Pfizer Inc
 Brent Tucker Minor –  co-chair of the Ryan White Planning Council. He is living with HIV.
 Jose A. Montero, M.D. – associate professor of medicine, University of South Florida
 Dandrick Moton – director, community and youth relations, Choosing to Excel
 Beny Primm, MD – The Addiction Research and Treatment Corp.
 David Reznik, D.D.S. – chief, dental service, Grady Health System. Reznik is an expert in oral health care for people living with HIV, and serves on the Ryan White Planning Council of Metropolitan Atlanta.
 Debbie Rock – executive director, Baltimore Pediatric HIV Program, Inc
 Reverend Edwin Sanders II – senior servant, Metropolitan Interdenominational Church
 Prem Sharma, D.D.S., M.S. – associate dean emeritus, Marquette School of Dentistry
 Lisa Mai Shoemaker – HIV/AIDS activist/motivational speaker
 Anita Smith – Children's AIDS Fund
 Don Sneed – executive director, Renaissance III, a non-profit organization providing AIDS-related services in south Texas. Sneed is a former addict, and is living with HIV.
 M. Monica Sweeney, M.D., M.P.H. – assistant clinical professor of preventive medicine, SUNY Health Science Center of Brooklyn
 Ram  Yogev, MD – professor of pediatrics, Northwestern University Medical School and medical director, pediatric and maternal HIV infection, Ann & Robert H. Lurie Children's Hospital of Chicago
 Bob Bollinger MD, MPH-Professor of Infectious Diseases and International Health Johns Hopkins University

Criticism 

Critics have said they lack confidence in PACHA and note that the council as reorganized under President Bush held only two meetings in 2002 and issued only five recommendations to the White House. By comparison, the President's Commission on the HIV Epidemic (Watkins Commission) submitted 597 recommendations to the Reagan Administration.

The Union of Concerned Scientists released a report in February 2004 entitled Scientific Integrity in Policymaking that said that President Bush intentionally appointed under-qualified individuals to PACHA as part of a broader effort to manipulate the government's scientific advisory system by providing the appearance of expert advice while controlling the advice given.

Critics pointed to the appointment of Dr. Joseph McIlhaney, a Texas-based doctor known for rejecting the use of condoms to prevent the spread of HIV and other sexually transmitted diseases and for his advocacy of abstinence-only programs despite negligible evidence that they reduce pregnancy rates among young people.

Six members of the committee resigned in June 2017, citing as the reason that the president, "has no strategy to address the ongoing HIV/AIDS epidemic, seeks zero input from experts to formulate HIV policy, and—most concerning—pushes legislation that will harm people living with HIV and halt or reverse important gains made in the fight against this disease".
In December 2017 Trump dismissed all the remaining 16 members.
Gabriel Maldonado, a former member of PACHA, said in a Washington Post article "Like any administration, they want their own people there," identifying "ideological and philosophical differences" and that many of the remaining members, including her, were appointed by former president Barack Obama.  "I was co-chair of the disparities committee," Maldonado added, "so much of my advocacy and policy references surrounded vulnerable populations, addressing issuing of diverse communities, specifically looking at the impacts of the LGBT community, namely, the disproportionate impact of HIV and AIDS to people of color, gay men, transgender women...and a lot of those key vulnerable populations are not being prioritized in this administration."
Newsweek stated that there were fears that "the charter for PACHA will be re-written with renewed focus on abstinence and religious, non-evidence based public health approaches."

See also 
 National Commission on AIDS
 Office of National AIDS Policy
 President's Commission on the HIV Epidemic
 President's Emergency Plan for AIDS Relief

References

External links 
 Official PACHA home page
 AIDS.gov – The U.S. Federal Domestic HIV/AIDS Resource
 HIVtest.org – Find an HIV testing site near you

HIV/AIDS organizations in the United States
Health policy in the United States
United States national commissions